Huncholini the 1st is the second mixtape by British rapper M Huncho. It was released on 31 January 2020 via Island Records. It features guest appearances from D-Block Europe, Headie One and Nafe Smallz. The mixtape debuted at number 5 on the UK Albums Chart. It spawned three singles: Quincy Tellem-produced "Thumb" and "Bando Ballads" and ADP/Payday produced "Pee Pee", which peaked at numbers 30, 78 and 32, on the UK Singles Chart, respectively.

The mixtape was BPI-certified Silver in October 2020 for over 60,000 streaming and sales units moved in the United Kingdom, becoming M Huncho’s second project to receive a Silver certificate after his 2019 mixtape, Utopia.

Track listing

Charts

Weekly charts

Year-end charts

Certifications

References

2020 albums
M Huncho albums
Island Records albums